The Saddam–al-Qaeda conspiracy theory was a conspiracy theory based on allegations made by U.S. government officials, who claimed that a highly secretive relationship existed between Iraqi President Saddam Hussein and the radical Islamist militant organization Al-Qaeda between 1992 and 2003, specifically through a series of meetings reportedly involving the Iraqi Intelligence Service (IIS). In the lead-up to the Iraq War, George W. Bush administration officials alleged that the Saddam Hussein regime had an operational relationship with al-Qaeda (even though there was scant credible evidence of such a relationship at the time), basing the administration's rationale for war, in part, on this allegation and others.

A 2007 Pentagon Inspector General report concluded that Douglas Feith's office in the Department of Defense had "developed, produced, and then disseminated alternative intelligence assessments on the Iraq and al-Qaeda relationship, which included some conclusions that were inconsistent with the consensus of the Intelligence Community, to senior decision-makers."

The consensus of intelligence experts has been that these contacts never led to an operational relationship, and that consensus is backed up by reports from the independent 9/11 Commission and by declassified Defense Department reports as well as by the Senate Select Committee on Intelligence, whose 2006 report of Phase II of its investigation into prewar intelligence reports concluded that there was no evidence of ties between Saddam Hussein and al-Qaeda.  Critics of the Bush Administration have said Bush was intentionally building a case for war with Iraq without regard to factual evidence. On April 29, 2007, former Director of Central Intelligence George Tenet said on 60 Minutes, "We could never verify that there was any Iraqi authority, direction and control, complicity with al-Qaeda for 9/11 or any operational act against America, period."

Background

During the lead-up to the Iraq War, two questions were raised regarding an alleged connection between Saddam Hussein's government and al-Qaeda. The first question was whether the Iraqi regime and al-Qaeda had a cooperative relationship, and the second was whether Saddam Husein's government supported the September 11 attacks.

While some contacts between agents of Saddam's government and members of al-Qaeda have been alleged, the consensus of experts and analysts has held that those contacts never led to an "operational" relationship. The Senate Select Committee on Intelligence concluded that there was only one actual encounter between representatives of the Baathist regime and representatives of al-Qaeda. This single meeting took place in the Sudan in 1995, and the Iraqi representative, who is in custody and has been cooperating with investigators, said that after the meeting he "received word from his IIS chain-of-command that he should not see bin Laden again." The panel found evidence of only two other instances in which there was any communication between Saddam's regime and al-Qaeda members. On the other two occasions, the Committee concluded, Saddam Hussein rebuffed meeting requests from an al-Qaeda operative. The intelligence community has not found any other evidence of meetings between al-Qaeda and Iraq.

On the more specific question of whether Saddam Hussein was behind the attacks of September 11, 2001, the consensus view is that there is no credible evidence of his government's involvement. The US intelligence community (CIA, NSA, DIA, etc.) view, confirmed by the conclusions of the 9/11 Commission Report and the Senate Report on Iraqi WMD Intelligence, is that there was no cooperative effort between the two and that Saddam did not support the 9/11 attacks; it was considered that the difference in ideology between Saddam and al-Qaeda made cooperation in any terrorist attacks very unlikely. The Senate Report discussed the possibility of Saddam offering al-Qaeda training and safe-haven, but confirmed the CIA's conclusion that there was no evidence of operational cooperation between the two. By March 20, 2006, President George W. Bush made clear that his administration did not have any evidence to prove Saddam played a role in the attacks.

History of claims

After the September 11 attacks

The Bush Administration sought to link the Iraqi dictator to Islamist radicals early on in the aftermath of the September 11 attacks.  President Bush allegedly made the case to Tony Blair as early as September 14, 2001, although Blair urged him not to pursue the claim.

In addition, Bush received on September 21, 2001, a classified President's Daily Brief (PDB), indicating the U.S. intelligence community had no evidence linking Saddam Hussein to the September 11th attacks and that "there was scant credible evidence that Iraq had any significant collaborative ties with Al Qaeda."

Dick Cheney and Prague

Vice President Dick Cheney had told Meet the Press on  December 9, 2001, that Iraq was harboring Abdul Rahman Yasin, a suspect in the 1993 World Trade Center bombing, and repeated the statement in another appearance on September 14, 2003, saying "We learned more and more that there was a relationship between Iraq and al-Qaida that stretched back through most of the decade of the '90s, that it involved training, for example, on BW and CW, that al-Qaida sent personnel to Baghdad to get trained on the systems that are involved. The Iraqis providing bomb-making expertise and advice to the al-Qaida organization. We know, for example, in connection with the original World Trade Center bombing in '93 that one of the bombers was Iraqi, returned to Iraq after the attack of '93. And we've learned subsequent to that, since we went into Baghdad and got into the intelligence files, that this individual probably also received financing from the Iraqi government as well as safe haven." and once again in an interview with National Public Radio in January, 2004, stating that there had been "overwhelming evidence" of a relationship between Saddam and al-Qaeda based on evidence including Iraq's purported harboring of Yasin.

In the same Meet the Press interviews, Cheney implied a connection between Iraq and Mohamed Atta; "The Czech interior minister said today that an Iraqi intelligence officer met with Mohammed Atta, one of the ringleaders of the September 11 terrorists attacks on the United States, just five months before the synchronized hijackings and mass killings were carried out." and "With respect to 9/11, of course, we've had the story that's been public out there. The Czechs alleged that Mohamed Atta, the lead attacker, met in Prague with a senior Iraqi intelligence official five months before the attack, but we've never been able to develop any more of that yet either in terms of confirming it or discrediting it. We just don't know." Czech
officials have since backed off of this claim, and even Cheney has since acknowledged that the notion "that the meeting ever took place" has been "pretty well knocked down now."

Intelligence community claims and doubts

In the initial stages of the war on terror, the Central Intelligence Agency, under George Tenet, was rising to prominence as the lead agency in the Afghanistan war. But when Tenet insisted in his personal meetings with President Bush that there was no connection between al-Qaeda and Iraq, Dick Cheney and Secretary of Defense Donald Rumsfeld initiated a secret program to re-examine the evidence and marginalize the CIA and Tenet. The questionable intelligence acquired by this secret program was "stovepiped" to the vice president and presented to the public. In some cases, Cheney's office would leak the intelligence to reporters, where it would be reported by outlets such as The New York Times. Cheney would subsequently appear on the Sunday political television talk shows to discuss the intelligence, referencing The New York Times as the source to give it credence.

The prewar CIA testimony was that there was evidence of senior level contacts between Iraq and al-Qaeda going back a decade involving Iraq providing al-Qaeda with various kinds of training-combat, bomb-making, and [chemical, biological, radiological and nuclear] CBRN, but that they had no credible information that Baghdad had foreknowledge of the 11 September attacks or any other al-Qaeda strike. The CIA's report on Iraq's ties to terrorism noted in September 2002 that the CIA did not have "credible intelligence reporting" of operational collaboration between Iraq and al-Qaeda.  According to the Senate Select Committee on Intelligence, the CIA reported that "al-Qaida, including Bin Ladin personally, and Saddam were leery of close cooperation," but that the "mutual antipathy of the two would not prevent tactical, limited cooperation." (p. 338)  The current consensus view of experts is that although members of Saddam Hussein's intelligence service may have met with al-Qaeda terrorists over the last decade or so, that there was no evidence that Iraq and al Qaeda were linked operationally. It is now known that the main source for the CIA's claim that Iraq had trained al-Qaeda members in bomb making and poisons and gases included the now recanted claims of captured al-Qaeda leader Ibn al-Shaykh al-Libi.  The CIA has since recalled and reissued all its intelligence reporting about al-Libi's recanted claims.  Likewise, the DIA communicated to President Bush in February 2002 its stance that al-Libi "was intentionally misleading his debriefers."

9/11 Commission conclusions

The 9/11 Commission stated in its report that bin Laden had been sponsoring anti-Saddam Islamists in Iraqi Kurdistan, and sought to attract them into his Islamic army. Those forces mostly operated in areas not under Saddam's control. Sudanese Islamic leader Hassan al-Turabi, to protect his ties with Iraq, brokered an agreement with bin Laden to stop supporting activities against Saddam. Bin Laden seemed to honor this agreement for a time, although he continued to aid Islamic extremists in Kurdistan. In the late 1990s, these extremist groups suffered major defeats by Kurdish forces. In 2001, the extremist groups, with help from Bin Laden, re-formed into an organization called Ansar al-Islam. Some indications exist that by then the Iraqi regime tolerated and may even have helped Ansar al Islam against the common Kurdish enemy.

However, the commission overall concluded that "to date [2004] we have seen no evidence that these or the earlier contacts ever developed into a collaborative operational relationship," and did not find proof "indicating that Iraq cooperated with al-Qaeda in developing or carrying out any attacks against the United States." This conclusion is consistent with the findings of various investigations into specific aspects of the Saddam Hussein/al-Qaeda relationship, including those conducted by the Central Intelligence Agency, Defense Intelligence Agency, Federal Bureau of Investigation, and National Security Council. The Senate Report of Pre-war Intelligence on Iraq also reviewed the intelligence community's conclusions and found that they were justifiable.

Operation Iraqi Freedom documents

The U.S. government released documents, called the 'Operation Iraqi Freedom documents', regarding which the Pentagon has cautioned it has made 'no determination regarding the authenticity of the documents, validity or factual accuracy.'" Some claim the information contained in some of the documents suggest Saddam and al Qaeda may have been willing to work together. 9/11 Commission member Bob Kerrey looked at some of the documents and "was careful to say that new documents translated last night by ABC News did not prove Saddam Hussein played a role in any way in plotting the attacks of September 11, 2001." Nevertheless, Kerrey stated that one of the documents suggests that "Saddam was a significant enemy of the United States."

The Office of the Director of National Intelligence has already looked at the documents and warned that "amateur translators won't find any major surprises, such as proof Hussein hid stockpiles of chemical weapons."  The Pentagon also went through the documents and released an official study of the documents; the study does not report on any evidence linking Saddam to al-Qaeda (see below).  The 2006 Senate Select Committee on Intelligence concluded that "additional reviews of documents recovered in Iraq are unlikely to provide information that would contradict the Committee's findings or conclusions." Intelligence expert Steven Aftergood suggested that many are using the release of these documents as an opportunity to find "a retrospective justification for the war in Iraq."

Bush Administration retracts its position
On March 21, 2006, Bush sought to distance himself from the allegation of any link. He said: "First, just if I might correct a misperception, I don't think we ever said—at least I know I didn't say that there was a direct connection between September the 11th and Saddam Hussein." Bush reaffirmed the White House position in even stronger terms in a press conference on 21 August 2006. Ken Herman of Cox News asked, "What did Iraq have to do with ... the attack on the World Trade Center?" Bush replied, "Nothing." Bush elaborated on his answer and added, "Nobody has ever suggested that the attacks of September the 11th were ordered by Iraq."

Opponents of his Iraq policy charged that his statement was inconsistent with his letter to Congress of March 21, 2003  and a minority (Democrat) staff report by the U.S. House of Representatives Committee on Government Reform claimed that "in 125 separate appearances, they [Bush, Cheney, Powell, Rumsfeld and Rice] made ... 61 misleading statements about Iraq's relationship with al-Qaeda."

American public opinion

Polls have shown that many Americans continued to believe that Saddam was linked to al-Qaeda, although the number who do so has slowly declined.  This discrepancy has been attributed by some to the way in which the U.S. mainstream media presented facts and opinion regarding the war on terror.

Skepticism of the Saddam–al-Qaeda link

Conflicting goals and ideologies 
Saddam Hussein was a Ba'athist, and Ba'athism is a movement which combines pan-Arab nationalism with secularism and Arab Socialism. The ideological founder of Ba'athism, Michel Aflaq, was himself a Christian.  It is therefore very much at odds with political Islamism, with which Saddam had long been at conflict; Saddam had kicked out Ayatollah Khomeini to France when he attempted to incite the Shias of Iraq to overthrow Saddam when Khomeini was in exile in Najaf which, ironically, was a catalyst for the Iranian Revolution and the resulting Iran-Iraq war. Khomeini pitted Saddam against a torrent of Islamic radicalism as Saddam faced his own people who were inspired by the Iranian Revolution and eight years of "Holy War" against Iranians who utilized suicide tactics, which wreaked havoc on the Iraqi armed forces (which ultimately solved this problem with chemical weapons). 

Even during the Lebanese Civil War, Saddam supported Michel Aoun and the Christian Maronite Forces as opposed to the Amal Movement or Hezbollah, which were funded by Iran and most other Arab countries. When Iraq invaded Kuwait in August 1990, Osama bin Laden offered to defend Saudi Arabia by sending mujahideen from Afghanistan to repel Saddam's forces. After the Gulf War, bin Laden continued to criticize Saddam's Ba'ath administration, emphasizing that Saddam could not be trusted. Bin Laden told his biographer that "the land of the Arab world, the land is like a mother, and Saddam Hussein is fucking his mother."  In Iraq itself Saddam abolished sharia courts, cracked down ruthlessly against any Islamist movement, responding with mass executions and torture whenever he felt threatened by them, liberalized society by promoting Western ideals of society and law (he allegedly bragged to western diplomats that the "national drink" of Iraq was Johnnie Walker Blue Label) and usually kept secular Sunnis and Christians within his government. 

Ultimately, Saddam's resulting image in the Arab world was not of Islamism, but one of the most secular and anti-Islamist leaders of his generation. Therefore, Saddam had been long viewed unfavorably by Islamists, regardless of their allegiance or political ideology, with the general view of him being a corrupt, dishonest, and self-serving dictator rather than an Islamic Leader, an image he tried to portray in his later years in power (he shocked the Arab world when he had a Quran commissioned to be written in his blood). As such, many analysts found it impossible that Saddam would support radical Islamists such as al-Qaeda after fighting Iran for eight years and suppressing his own Islamist rebellions throughout the 90s.

Robert Pape's exhaustive study of suicide terrorism found that "al-Qaeda's transnational suicide terrorists have come overwhelmingly from America's closest allies in the Muslim world and not at all from the Muslim regimes that the U.S. State Department considers 'state sponsors of terrorism'." Pape notes that no al-Qaeda suicide attackers came from Iraq. Daniel Byman's study of state sponsorship of terrorism similarly did not list Iraq as a significant state sponsor, and called the al-Qaeda connection "a rationale that before the war was strained and after it seems an ever-weaker reed." The conclusion of counterterrorism experts Rohan Gunaratna, Bruce Hoffman, and Daniel Benjamin, as well as journalists Peter Bergen and Jason Burke (who have both written extensively on al-Qaeda), has been that there is no evidence that suggests any collaborative relationship between Saddam Hussein and al-Qaeda. That was similar to the conclusion of specific investigations by the National Security Council, the Central Intelligence Agency, Federal Bureau of Investigation, and 9/11 Commission, among others. The Senate Select Committee on Intelligence reviewed the CIA's investigation and concluded that the CIA's conclusion that there was no evidence of operational collaboration was justified.	

While Saddam was not involved in the September 11 attacks, members of his government did have contacts with al-Qaeda over the years; many of the links, as will be seen below, are not considered by experts and analysts as convincing evidence of a collaborative operational relationship. Former counterterrorism czar Richard A. Clarke writes,

[t]he simple fact is that lots of people, particularly in the Middle East, pass along many rumors and they end up being recorded and filed by U.S. intelligence agencies in raw reports. That does not make them 'intelligence'. Intelligence involves analysis of raw reports, not merely their enumeration or weighing them by the pound. Analysis, in turn, involves finding independent means of corroborating the reports. Did al-Qaeda agents ever talk to Iraqi agents? I would be startled if they had not. I would also be startled if American, Israeli, Iranian, British, or Jordanian agents had somehow failed to talk to al-Qaeda or Iraqi agents. Talking to each other is what intelligence agents do, often under assumed identities or 'false flags,' looking for information or possible defectors.

Larry Wilkerson, former Chief of Staff to Secretary of State Colin Powell, told Voice of America that

... Saddam Hussein had his agenda and al-Qaida had its agenda, and those two agendas were incompatible. And so if there was any contact between them, it was a contact that was rebuffed rather than a contact that led to meaningful relationships between them.

Lack of evidence 
The purported meeting in Prague between Mohammed Atta and an Iraqi Intelligence officer, regarding which Vice President Cheney had stated "we've never been able to develop any more of that yet either in terms of confirming it or discrediting it", was dismissed by CIA Director George Tenet, who told the Senate Intelligence Committee in February 2004 that there was no evidence to support that allegation. In fact, the FBI had evidence that Atta was in Florida at the time, taking aircraft flight training; and the Iraqi officer in question, Ahmed Khalil Ibrahim Samir al Ani, has been captured and maintains he had never met Atta.

The repeated accusation by Cheney that Iraq harbored Abdul Rahman Yasin, one of the perpetrators of the 1993 World Trade Center bombing, conflicts with Iraq's 1998 offer to the FBI of extradition for Yasin in return for a statement clearing Iraq from any role in the attack. Even though the CIA and FBI had already concluded that Iraq played no role in the attack, the Clinton administration refused the offer. Iraq also offered to extradite Yasin in 2001, after the 9/11 attacks. In June 2002, an unnamed US intelligence official told 60 Minutes that Iraq had attached "extreme conditions" to the handing over of Yasin. According to the official, the Iraqis wanted the U.S. to sign a document laying out where Yasin had been since 1993, but that the US did not agree with their version of the facts. In any case, Yasin had cooperated with the FBI and they had released him, although they would later call it a "mistake." The CIA and FBI had nevertheless concluded in 1995 and 1996 that "the Iraqi government was in no way involved in the attack." Counterterrorism czar Richard Clarke called the allegations "absolutely without foundation."  The Iraqis made another offer to the Bush Administration in 2003 but this offer was also spurned.

Former National Security Council counterterrorism directors Daniel Benjamin and Steven Simon summarized the problem with the Bush Administration's view in the eyes of the intelligence community: "The administration pressed its case for war most emphatically by arguing that U.S. national security was imperiled by Saddam's ties to al-Qaeda. The argument had the obvious virtue of playing to the public's desire to see the war on terrorism prosecuted aggressively and conclusively. Yet, scant proof of these links was presented. The record showed a small number of contacts between jihadists and Iraqi officials. This was treated as the tip of an unseen iceberg of cooperation, even though it fell far short of anything that resembled significant cooperation in the eyes of the counterterrorism community—as it always had. No persuasive proof was given of money, weaponry, or training being provided."

Former Chief of Staff to Secretary of State Colin Powell, Col. Lawrence B. Wilkerson, has since revealed that "as the administration authorized harsh interrogation in April and May 2002—well before the Justice Department had rendered any legal opinion—its principal priority for intelligence was not aimed at pre-empting another terrorist attack on the U.S. but discovering a smoking gun linking Iraq and al-Qa'ida."

Background 

Just prior to Saddam's invasion of Kuwait, Saddam turned to religion perhaps to bolster his government (for example, adding the words "God is Great" in Arabic to the flag, and referring to God in his speeches).  After Saddam lost the Gulf War (and facing widespread rebellions from the Shia majority), he identified more closely with Islam by hosting international conferences and broadcasting Islamic sermons on national radio. In 1994, Saddam began his "Faith Campaign", which included the building and repair mosques, the closing of night clubs and changes to the law restricting alcohol consumption, Baath party officials were required to attend Friday prayers and government sponsored Quran reciting competitions held.

Some sources allege that several meetings between top Iraqi operatives and bin Laden took place, but these claims have been disputed by many other sources, including most of the original intelligence agencies that investigated these sources in the first place. Many in the intelligence community are skeptical about whether such meetings, if they took place at all, ever resulted in any meaningful relationship. Many of the claims of actual collaboration seem to have originated with people associated with the Iraqi National Congress whose credibility has been impeached and who have been accused of manipulating the evidence in order to lure the United States into war on false pretenses. In addition, many of the raw intelligence reports came to the awareness of the public through the leaking of a memo sent from Undersecretary of Defense for Policy Douglas J. Feith to the Senate Select Committee on Intelligence, the conclusions of which have been disputed by intelligence agencies including the CIA.  Feith's view of the relationship between Saddam and Osama differed from the official view of the intelligence community.  The memo was subsequently leaked to the media.  The Pentagon issued a statement cautioning that the memo was "a classified annex containing a list and description of the requested reports, so that the committee could obtain the reports from the relevant members of the intelligence community ... The classified annex was not an analysis of the substantive issue of the relationship between Iraq and al Qaeda, and it drew no conclusions."  The Pentagon warned that "Individuals who leak or purport to leak classified information are doing serious harm to national security; such activity is deplorable and may be illegal." Former head of the Middle East section of the DIA W. Patrick Lang told the Washington Post that the Weekly Standard article which published Feith's memo "is a listing of a mass of unconfirmed reports, many of which themselves indicate that the two groups continued to try to establish some sort of relationship. If they had such a productive relationship, why did they have to keep trying?"  And, according to the Post, "another former senior intelligence official said the memo is not an intelligence product but rather 'data points ... among the millions of holdings of the intelligence agencies, many of which are simply not thought likely to be true.'"

Some have suggested that an understanding was reached between Iraq and al-Qaeda, namely that al-Qaeda would not act against Saddam in exchange for Iraqi support, primarily in the form of training.  No evidence of such an understanding has ever been produced.  Some reports claim that Mohamed Atta met with an Iraqi intelligence operative in Prague, but intelligence officials have concluded that no such meeting took place. A training camp in Salman Pak, south of Baghdad, was said by a number of defectors to have been used to train international terrorists (assumed to be al-Qaeda members) in hijacking techniques using a real airplane as a prop. The defectors were inconsistent about a number of details. The camp has been examined by U.S. Marines, and intelligence analysts do not believe it was used by al-Qaeda. Some of these analysts believe it was actually used for counterterrorism training, while others believe it was used to train foreign fighters overtly aligned with Iraq. The Senate Select Committee on Intelligence concluded that "Postwar findings support the April 2002 Defense Intelligence Agency (DIA) assessment that there was no credible reporting on al-Qa'ida training at Salman Pak or anywhere else in Iraq. There have been no credible reports since the war that Iraq trained al-Qa'ida operatives at Salman Pak to conduct or support transnational terrorist operations."

In November 2001, a month after the September 11th attacks, Mubarak al-Duri was contacted by Sudanese intelligence services who informed him that the FBI had sent Jack Cloonan and several other agents, to speak with a number of people known to have ties to Bin Laden. al-Duri and another Iraqi colleague agreed to meet with Cloonan in a safe house overseen by the intelligence service. They were asked whether there was any possible connection between Saddam Hussein and al-Qaeda, and laughed stating that Bin Laden hated the dictator who he believed was a "Scotch-drinking, woman-chasing apostate."

Timeline

Much of the evidence of alleged links between Iraq and al-Qaeda is based on speculation about meetings that may have taken place between Iraqi officials and al-Qaeda members.  The idea that a meeting could have happened has been taken as evidence of substantial collaboration. As terrorism analyst Evan Kohlman points out, "While there have been a number of promising intelligence leads hinting at possible meetings between al-Qaeda members and elements of the former Baghdad regime, nothing has been yet shown demonstrating that these potential contacts were historically any more significant than the same level of communication maintained between Osama bin Laden and ruling elements in a number of Iraq's Persian Gulf neighbors, including Saudi Arabia, Iran, Yemen, Qatar, and Kuwait."

U.S. Secretary of State Colin Powell Addresses the U.N. Security Council

On February 5, 2003, then Secretary of State Colin Powell addressed the U.N. Security Council on the issue of Iraq. In the address, Powell made several claims about Iraq's ties to terrorism.  Powell acknowledged in January 2004 that the speech presented no hard evidence of collaboration between Saddam and al-Qaeda; he told reporters at a State Department press conference that "I have not seen smoking gun, concrete evidence about the connection, but I do believe the connections existed."  After Powell left office, he acknowledged that he was skeptical of the evidence presented to him for the speech.  He told Barbara Walters in an interview that he considered the speech a "blot" on his record and that he feels "terrible" about assertions that he made in the speech that turned out to be false.  He said, "There were some people in the intelligence community who knew at that time that some of these sources were not good, and shouldn't be relied upon, and they didn't speak up. That devastated me."  When asked specifically about a Saddam/al-Qaeda connection, Powell responded, "I have never seen a connection. ... I can't think otherwise because I'd never seen evidence to suggest there was one."

The following are quotations from the speech:
Iraq today harbors a deadly terrorist network headed by Abu Musab Al-Zarqawi, an associated in collaborator of Osama bin Laden and his Al Qaida lieutenants.  When our coalition ousted the Taliban, the Abu Musab Al-Zarqawi network helped establish another poison and explosive training center camp. And this camp is located in northeastern Iraq.  He traveled to Baghdad in May 2002 for medical treatment, staying in the capital of Iraq for two months while he recuperated to fight another day. During this stay, nearly two dozen extremists converged on Baghdad and established a base of operations there. These Al Qaida affiliates, based in Baghdad, now coordinate the movement of people, money and supplies into and throughout Iraq for his network, and they've now been operating freely in the capital for more than eight months.
We asked a friendly security service to approach Baghdad about extraditing Abu Musab Al-Zarqawi and providing information about him and his close associates. This service contacted Iraqi officials twice, and we passed details that should have made it easy to find Abu Musab Al-Zarqawi. The network remains in Baghdad. Abu Musab Al-Zarqawi still remains at large to come and go. Since last year, members of this network have been apprehended in France, Britain, Spain and Italy. By our last count, 116 operatives connected to this global web have been arrested.
Going back to the early and mid-1990s, when bin Laden was based in Sudan, an Al Qaida source tells us that Saddam and bin Laden reached an understanding that Al Qaida would no longer support activities against Baghdad.  Saddam became more interested as he saw Al Qaida's appalling attacks. A detained Al Qaida member tells us that Saddam was more willing to assist Al Qaida after the 1998 bombings of our embassies in Kenya and Tanzania. Saddam was also impressed by Al Qaida's attacks on the USS Cole in Yemen in October 2000.
Iraqis continued to visit bin Laden in his new home in Afghanistan. A senior defector, one of Saddam's former intelligence chiefs in Europe, says Saddam sent his agents to Afghanistan sometime in the mid-1990s to provide training to Al Qaida members on document forgery. From the late 1990s until 2001, the Iraqi embassy in Pakistan played the role of liaison to the Al Qaida organization.
The support that (inaudible) describes included Iraq offering chemical or biological weapons training for two Al Qaida associates beginning in December 2000. He says that a militant known as Abu Abdula Al-Iraqi (ph) had been sent to Iraq several times between 1997 and 2000 for help in acquiring poisons and gases. Abdula Al-Iraqi (ph) characterized the relationship he forged with Iraqi officials as successful.
As I said at the outset, none of this should come as a surprise to any of us. Terrorism has been a tool used by Saddam for decades. Saddam was a supporter of terrorism long before these terrorist networks had a name. And this support continues. The nexus of poisons and terror is new. The nexus of Iraq and terror is old. The combination is lethal.

The major claims set forth in Powell's speech—that Jordanian terrorist Abu Musab Al-Zarqawi constitutes a link between Saddam Hussein and al-Qaeda, and that Saddam's government provided training and assistance to al-Qaeda terrorists in Baghdad—have since been disputed by the intelligence community and terrorism experts.  The CIA issued a report in August 2004 that concluded, according to Knight-Ridder reporters, that there was "no conclusive evidence that the regime harbored Osama bin Laden associate Abu Musab Al-Zarqawi."  A U.S. official told Reuters that "the report did not make any final judgments or come to any definitive conclusions, adding "To suggest the case is closed on this would not be correct." Zarqawi reportedly entered Iraq from Iran, infiltrating the Kurdish north because it was the one part of the country not under Saddam's control. Intelligence experts point out that Zarqawi had few ties to Osama bin Laden either, noting that he was a rival, rather than an affiliate, of al-Qaeda.  A former Israeli intelligence official described the meeting between Zarqawi and bin Laden as "loathing at first sight."  And the other major claims in the speech are attributed by Powell to "an al-Qaeda source."  Karen DeYoung wrote, "A year after the invasion, the [CIA] acknowledged that the information had come from a single source who had been branded a liar by U.S. intelligence officials long before Powell's presentation."  This source turned out to be captured al-Qaeda leader Ibn al-Shaykh al-Libi, who was handed over to Egypt for interrogation.  According to The New York Times, al-Libi provided some accurate intelligence on al Qaeda and made some statements about Iraq and al Qaeda while in American custody, but it wasn't until being after he was handed over to Egypt that he made more specific assertions about Iraq training al Qaeda members in biological and chemical weapons.  A DIA report issued in February 2002 expressed skepticism about al-Libi's claims due to this, noting that he may have been subjected to harsh treatment while in Egyptian custody.  In February 2004, the CIA reissued the debriefing reports from al-Libi to note that he had recanted information.    A government official told The New York Times that al Libi's claims of harsh treatment had not been corroborated and the CIA has refused to comment specifically on al-Libi's case as much of the information remains classified; however, current and former government officials agreed to discuss the case on condition of anonymity. Two U.S. counter-terrorism officials told Newsweek that they believe the information that Powell cited about al-Iraqi came exclusively from al-Libi. A CIA officer told the United States Senate Select Committee on Intelligence that while the CIA believes al-Libi fabricated information, the CIA cannot determine whether, or what portions of, the original statements or the later recants are true of false.  The Senate report concluded that "The Intelligence Community has found no postwar information to indicate that Iraq provided CBW training to al-Qa'ida." (For more information, see Saddam Hussein and al-Qaeda timeline for 1995 and December 2005).

Official investigations and reports
Several official investigations by U.S. intelligence agencies, foreign intelligence agencies, and independent investigative bodies have looked into various aspects of the alleged links between Saddam Hussein and al-Qaeda.  Every single investigation has resulted in the conclusion that the data examined did not provide compelling evidence of a cooperative relationship between the two entities.

1993 WTC investigations
After the attack on the World Trade Center in 1993, there were several investigations of possible collaboration between Saddam Hussein and the terrorists who attacked the building.  Neil Herman, who headed the FBI investigation into the attack, noted that despite Yasin's presence in Baghdad, there was no evidence of Iraqi support for the attack. "We looked at that rather extensively," he told CNN terrorism expert Peter Bergen. "There were no ties to the Iraqi government." Bergen writes, "In sum, by the mid-'90s, the Joint Terrorism Task Force in New York, the F.B.I., the U.S. Attorney's office in the Southern District of New York, the C.I.A., the N.S.C., and the State Department had all found no evidence implicating the Iraqi government in the first Trade Center attack."

1998 National Security Council exercise
In 1998, Daniel Benjamin, who headed the National Security Council's counterterrorism division, led an exercise aimed at a critical analysis of the CIA's contention that Iraq and al Qaeda would not team up. "This was a red-team effort," he said. "We looked at this as an opportunity to disprove the conventional wisdom, and basically we came to the conclusion that the CIA had this one right."  Benjamin later told Boston Globe reporters, "No one disputes that there have been contacts over the years. In that part of the America-hating universe, contacts happen. But that's still a long way from suggesting that they were really working together."

2001 President's Daily Brief
Ten days after the September 11 attacks, President Bush receives a classified President's Daily Brief (that had been prepared at his request) indicating that the U.S. intelligence community had no evidence linking Saddam Hussein to the September 11th attacks and that there was "scant credible evidence that Iraq had any significant collaborative ties with Al Qaeda." The PDB writes off the few contacts that existed between Saddam's government and al-Qaeda as attempts to monitor the group rather than attempts to work with them. According to the National Journal, "Much of the contents of the PDB were later incorporated, albeit in a slightly different form, into a lengthier CIA analysis examining not only Al Qaeda's contacts with Iraq, but also Iraq's support for international terrorism."  This PDB was one of the documents the Bush Administration refused to turn over to the Senate Report of Pre-war Intelligence on Iraq, even on a classified basis, and refuses to discuss other than to acknowledge its existence.

2001-2 Atta in Prague investigations

After the allegation surfaced that 9/11 hijacker Mohamed Atta was seen in Prague in 2001 meeting with an Iraqi diplomat, a number of investigations looked into the possibility that this had occurred.  All of them concluded that all known evidence suggested that such a meeting was unlikely at best.  The January 2003 CIA report Iraqi Support for Terrorism noted that "the most reliable reporting to date casts doubt on this possibility" that such a meeting occurred. Director of Central Intelligence George Tenet released "the most complete public assessment by the agency on the issue" in a statement to the Senate Armed Services Committee in July 2004, stating that the CIA was "increasingly skeptical" any such meeting took place.  John McLaughlin, who at the time was the Deputy Director of the CIA, described the extent of the Agency's investigation into the claim: "Well, on something like the Atta meeting in Prague, we went over that every which way from Sunday. We looked at it from every conceivable angle. We peeled open the source, examined the chain of acquisition. We looked at photographs. We looked at timetables. We looked at who was where and when. It is wrong to say that we didn't look at it. In fact, we looked at it with extraordinary care and intensity and fidelity." A New York Times investigation involving "extensive interviews with leading Czech figures" reported that Czech officials had backed off the claim. 

Both the FBI and the Czech police chief investigated the issue and came to similar conclusions; FBI director Robert Mueller noted that the FBI's investigation "ran down literally hundreds of thousands of leads and checked every record we could get our hands on, from flight reservations to car rentals to bank accounts." The 9/11 Commission investigation, which looked over both the FBI and Czech intelligence investigations, concluded that "[n]o evidence has been found that Atta was in the Czech Republic in April 2001." The Commission still could not "absolutely rule out the possibility" that Atta was in Prague on 9 April traveling under an alias, but the Commission concluded that "There was no reason for such a meeting, especially considering the risk it would pose to the operation. By April 2001, all four pilots had completed most of their training, and the muscle hijackers were about to begin entering the United States. The available evidence does not support the original Czech report of an Atta-Ani meeting." (p. 229)

2002 DIA reports
In February 2002, the U.S. Defense Intelligence Agency issued Defense Intelligence Terrorism Summary No. 044-02, the existence of which was revealed on 9 December 2005, by Doug Jehl in the New York Times, which impugned the credibility of information gleaned from captured al Qaeda leader Ibn al-Shaykh al-Libi. The DIA report suggested that al-Libi had been "intentionally misleading" his interrogators. The DIA report also cast significant doubt on the possibility of a Saddam Hussein-al-Qaeda conspiracy: "Saddam's regime is intensely secular and is wary of Islamic revolutionary movements. Moreover, Baghdad is unlikely to provide assistance to a group it cannot control."<ref>Douglas Jehl: Report Warned Bush Team About Intelligence Doubts. The New York Times, November 6, 2005; p. 14.</ref>

In April 2002, the DIA assessed that "there was no credible reporting on al-Qa'ida training at Salman Pak or anywhere else in Iraq.

2002 British intelligence report
In October 2002, a British Intelligence investigation of possible links between Iraq and al-Qaeda and the possibility of Iraqi WMD attacks issued a report concluding: "al Qaeda has shown interest in gaining chemical and biological expertise from Iraq, but we do not know whether any such training was provided. We have no intelligence of current cooperation between Iraq and al Qaeda and do not believe that al Qaeda plans to conduct terrorist attacks under Iraqi direction.

2003 CIA report
In January 2003, the CIA released a special Report to Congress entitled Iraqi Support for Terrorism. The report concludes that "In contrast to the patron-client pattern between Iraq and its Palestinian surrogates, the relationship between Iraq and al-Qaida appears to more closely resemble that of two independent actors trying to exploit each other—their mutual suspicion suborned by al-Qaida's interest in Iraqi assistance, and Baghdad's interest in al-Qaida's anti-U.S. attacks. ... The Intelligence Community has no credible information that Baghdad had foreknowledge of the 11 September attacks or any other al-Qaida strike." (See below). Michael Scheuer, the main researcher assigned to review the research into the project, described the review and his conclusions: "For about four weeks in late 2002 and early 2003, I and several others were engaged full time in searching CIA files—seven days a week, often far more than eight hours a day.  At the end of the effort, we had gone back ten years in the files and had reviewed nearly twenty thousand documents that amounted to well over fifty thousand pages of materials. ... There was no information that remotely supported the analysis that claimed there was a strong working relationship between Iraq and al Qaeda. I was embarrassed because this reality invalidated the analysis I had presented on the subject in my book. Scheuer states that he was not part of the analysis team that produced Iraqi Support for Terrorism, but that he was the main researcher reviewing the evidence and conclusions of that report. According to the SSCI report, "Iraqi Support for Terrorism contained the following summary judgments regarding Iraq's provision of training to al-Qaida: Regarding the Iraq-al-Qa'ida relationship, reporting from sources of varying reliability points to ... incidents of training. ... The most disturbing aspect of the relationship is the dozen or so reports of varying reliability mentioning the involvement of Iraq or Iraqi nationals in al-Qa'ida's efforts to obtain CBW training." The report questioned the information coming from captured al-Qaeda leader Ibn al-Shaykh al-Libi, stating "the detainee was not in a position to know if any training had taken place." Despite this, Colin Powell cited al-Libi's claims in his speech to the United Nations Security Council in February 2003. (See above). The next day, President Bush gave a brief talk at the Roosevelt Room in the White House with Powell by his side and stated the following: "One of the greatest dangers we face is that weapons of mass destruction might be passed to terrorists who would not hesitate to use those weapons. ... Iraq has bomb-making and document forgery experts to work with Al Qaeda. Iraq has also provided Al Qaeda with chemical and biological weapons training." Michele Davis, a spokeswoman for the National Security Council, told Newsweek that it was impossible to determine whether the dissent from the DIA and questions raised by the CIA were seen by officials at the White House prior to the president's remarks. A counter-terrorism official told Newsweek that while CIA reports on al-Libi were distributed widely around U.S. intelligence agencies and policy-making offices, many such routine reports are not regularly read by senior policy-making officials. Davis also stated that President Bush's remarks were "based on what was put forward to him as the views of the intelligence community" and that those views came from "an aggregation" of sources. Newsweek reported that "The new documents also raise the possibility that caveats raised by intelligence analysts about al-Libi's claims were withheld from Powell when he was preparing his Security Council speech. Larry Wilkerson, who served as Powell's chief of staff and oversaw the vetting of Powell's speech, responded to an e-mail from Newsweek Wednesday stating that he was unaware of the DIA doubts about al-Libi at the time the speech was being prepared. 'We never got any dissent with respect to those lines you cite ... indeed the entire section that now we know came from [al-Libi],' Wilkerson wrote."

2003 British intelligence report
In January 2003, British intelligence completed a classified report on Iraq that concluded that "there are no current links between the Iraqi regime and the al-Qaeda network."  The report was leaked to the BBC, who published information about it on February 5, the same day Colin Powell addressed the United Nations.  According to BBC, the report "says al-Qaeda leader Osama Bin Laden views Iraq's ruling Ba'ath party as running contrary to his religion, calling it an 'apostate regime'.  'His aims are in ideological conflict with present day Iraq,' it says."  The BBC reported that former British Foreign Secretary Jack Straw insisted that intelligence had shown that the Iraqi regime appeared to be allowing a permissive environment "in which al-Qaeda is able to operate ... Certainly we have some evidence of links between al-Qaeda and various people in Iraq ... What we don't know, and the prime minister and I have made it very clear, is the extent of those links ... What we also know, however, is that the Iraqi regime have been up to their necks in the pursuit of terrorism generally."

2003 Israeli intelligence
In February 2003, Israeli intelligence sources told the Associated Press that no link has been conclusively established between Saddam and Al Qaeda.  According to the AP story, "Boaz Ganor, an Israeli counter-terrorism expert, told the AP he knows of no Iraqi ties to terror groups, beyond Baghdad's relationship with Palestinian militias and possibly Osama bin Laden's Al Qaeda. ... A senior Israeli security source told the AP that Israel has not yet found evidence of an Iraqi-Palestinian-Al Qaeda triangle, and that several investigations into possible Al Qaeda ties to Palestinian militias have so far not yielded substantial results.  Ganor said Al Qaeda has put out feelers to Palestinian groups, but ties are at a very preliminary stage."

2003 Feith memo
In October 2003, Douglas J. Feith, undersecretary of defense for policy and head of the controversial Office of Special Plans, sent a memo to Congress that included "a classified annex containing a list and description of the requested reports, so that the committee could obtain the reports from the relevant members of the intelligence community. ... The classified annex was not an analysis of the substantive issue of the relationship between Iraq and al Qaeda, and it drew no conclusions." The memo was subsequently leaked to the media and became the foundation for reports in the Weekly Standard by Stephen F. Hayes.Isikoff, Michael and Hosenball, Mark. Case Decidedly Not Closed, Newsweek. November 19, 2003. W. Patrick Lang, former head of the Middle East section of Defense Intelligence Agency, called the Feith memo "a listing of a mass of unconfirmed reports, many of which themselves indicate that the two groups continued to try to establish some sort of relationship. If they had such a productive relationship, why did they have to keep trying?" Daniel Benjamin criticized the memo as well, noting that "in any serious intelligence review, much of the material presented would quickly be discarded." A Pentagon press release warned: "Individuals who leak or purport to leak classified information are doing serious harm to national security; such activity is deplorable and may be illegal."

2004 Carnegie study
In January 2004, Carnegie Endowment for International Peace scholars Joseph Cirincione, Jessica Tuchman Mathews, and George Perkovich publish their study WMD in Iraq: Evidence and Implications, which looked into Saddam's relationship with al-Qaeda and concluded that "although there have been periodic meetings between Iraqi and Al Qaeda agents, and visits by Al Qaeda agents to Baghdad, the most intensive searching over the last two years has produced no solid evidence of a cooperative relationship between Saddam's government and Al Qaeda." The study also found "some evidence that there were no operational links" between the two entities.

2004 FBI interrogation reports
During the Interrogation of Saddam Hussein in the first half of 2004, Federal Bureau of Investigation (FBI) Special Agent George Piro had a series of 25 face-to-face meetings with Saddam Hussein, while he was held as a prisoner of war at the United States' military detention facility at Baghdad International Airport. The reports Piro filed during the interrogation process were declassified and released in 2009 under a U.S. Freedom of Information Act request. Hussein had reportedly maintained that he did not collaborate with Al-Qaeda, said he feared Al-Qaeda would have turned on him, and was quoted calling Osama bin Laden a "zealot."

2004 9/11 Commission Report
The official report issued by the 9/11 Commission in July 2004 addressed the issue of a possible conspiracy between the government of Iraq and al-Qaeda in the September 11 attacks. The report addressed specific allegations of contacts between al-Qaeda and members of Saddam Hussein's government and concluded that there was no evidence that such contacts developed into a collaborative operational relationship, and that they did not cooperate to commit terrorist attacks against the United States.  The report includes the following information:

 2004 Senate Report of Pre-war Intelligence on Iraq 

Looking at pre-war intelligence on Iraq, the Senate Select Committee on Intelligence examined "the quality and quantity of U.S. intelligence on Iraqi weapons of mass destruction, ties to terrorist groups, Saddam Hussein's threat to stability and security in the region, and his repression of his own people;" and "the objectivity, reasonableness, independence, and accuracy of the judgments reached by the Intelligence Community". In Section 12 of the report, titled Iraq's Links to Terrorism, the Senate committee examined the CIA's "five primary finished intelligence products on Iraq's links to terrorism."  The report focused specifically on the CIA's 2003 study.  After examining all the intelligence, the Senate committee concluded that the CIA had accurately assessed that contacts between Saddam Hussein's regime and members of al-Qaeda "did not add up to an established formal relationship."

In a subsection titled Iraq's Relationship with al-Qaida, the report states the following:

The CIA assessed that: Regarding the Iraq-al-Qaeda relationship, reporting from sources of varying reliability points to a number of contacts, incidents of training, and discussions of Iraqi safehaven for Usama bin Laden and his organization dating from the early 1990s. Iraq's interaction with al-Qaeda is impelled by mutual antipathy toward the United States and the Saudi royal family and by bin Ladin's interest in unconventional weapons and relocation sites. The relationship between Iraq and al-Qaeda appears to more closely resemble that of two independent actors trying to exploit each other - their mutual suspicion suborned by al-Qaeda's interest in Iraqi assistance, and Baghdad's interest in al-Qaida's anti-U.S. attacks. The Intelligence Community has no credible information that Baghdad had foreknowledge of the 11 September attacks or any other al-Qaeda strike, but continues to pursue all leads.

The report continued by stating:

Due to the limited amount and questionable quality of reporting on the leadership intentions of Saddam Hussein and Usama bin Ladin, the CIA was unable to make conclusive assessments in "Iraqi Support for Terrorism" regarding Iraq's relationship with al-Qaeda. The CIA stated in the Scope Note: Our knowledge of Iraq's ties to terrorism is evolving ... This paper's conclusions-especially regarding the difficult and elusive question of the exact nature of Iraq's relations with al-Qaeda-are based on currently available information that is at times contradictory and derived from sources with varying degrees of reliability ... While our understanding of Iraq's overall connections to al-Qaeda has grown considerably, our appreciation of these links is still emerging.

In Section 13 of the report, titled Intelligence Community Collection Activities Against Iraq's links to Terrorism, the report stated the following:

Based on the information the CIA made available to the Senate Committee, the committee published a series of conclusions in the Senate Report of Pre-war Intelligence on Iraq.  These included the following:

2004 CIA report
In August, the CIA finished another assessment of the question of Saddam's links to al-Qaeda.  This assessment had been requested by the office of the Vice President, who asked specifically that the CIA take another look at the possibility that Jordanian terrorist Abu Musab al-Zarqawi constituted a link between Saddam and al-Qaeda, as Colin Powell had claimed in his speech to the United Nations Security Council.  The assessment concluded that there was no evidence that Saddam Hussein's regime harbored Jordanian terrorist Abu Musab al-Zarqawi. A U.S. official familiar with the new CIA assessment said intelligence analysts were unable to determine conclusively the nature of the relationship between al-Zarqawi and Saddam.  "It's still being worked," he said. "It (the assessment) ... doesn't make clear-cut, bottom-line judgments" about whether Saddam's regime was aiding al-Zarqawi. The official told Knight Ridder "What is indisputable is that Zarqawi was operating out of Baghdad and was involved in a lot of bad activities," but that the report didn't conclude that Saddam's regime had provided "aid, comfort and succor" to al-Zarqawi.  According to Knight Ridder, "Some officials believe that Saddam's secular regime kept an eye on al-Zarqawi,  but didn't actively assist him."  Knight Ridder reporters called the CIA study "the latest assessment that calls into question one of President Bush's key justifications for last year's U.S.-led invasion of Iraq."

2005 update of CIA report
In October 2005, the CIA updated the 2004 report to conclude that Saddam's regime "did not have a relationship, harbor, or even turn a blind eye toward Mr. Zarqawi and his associates," according to the Senate Select Committee on Intelligence (see 2006 report below). Two counterterrorism analysts told Newsweek that Zarqawi did likely receive medical treatment in Baghdad in 2002, but that Saddam's government may never have known Zarqawi was in Iraq because Zarqawi used "false cover." An intelligence official also told Newsweek the current draft of the report says that "most evidence suggests Saddam Hussein did not provide Zarqawi safe haven before the war. It also recognizes that there are still unanswered questions and gaps in knowledge about the relationship."  According to Newsweek, "The most recent CIA analysis is an update—based on fresh reporting from Iraq and interviews with former Saddam officials—of a classified report that analysts in the CIA's Directorate of Intelligence first produced more than a year ago."

2006 Pentagon study
In February 2006, the Pentagon published a study of the so-called Harmony database documents captured in Afghanistan.  While the study did not look specifically at allegations of Iraq's ties to al-Qaeda, it did analyze papers that offer insight into the history of the movement and tensions among the leadership.  In particular, it found evidence that al-Qaeda jihadists had viewed Saddam as an "infidel" and cautioned against working with him.

2006 Senate Report of Pre-War Intelligence

In September 2006, the Senate Select Committee on Intelligence released two reports constituting Phase II of its study of pre-war intelligence claims regarding Iraq's pursuit of WMD and alleged links to al-Qaeda.  These bipartisan reports included "Findings about Iraq's WMD Programs and Links to Terrorism and How they Compare with Prewar Assessments" and "The Use by the Intelligence Community of Information Provided by the Iraqi National Congress". The reports concluded, according to David Stout of The New York Times, that "there is no evidence that Saddam Hussein had prewar ties to Al Qaeda and one of the terror organization's most notorious members, Abu Musab al-Zarqawi." The "Postwar Findings" volume of the study concluded that there was no evidence of any Iraqi support of al-Qaeda, al-Zarqawi, or Ansar al-Islam.  The "Iraqi National Congress" volume concluded that "false information" from INC-affiliated sources was used to justify key claims in the prewar intelligence debate and that this information was "widely distributed in intelligence products" prior to the war.  It also concluded that the INC "attempted to influence US policy on Iraq by providing false information through defectors directed at convincing the United States that Iraq possessed weapons of mass destruction and had links to terrorists."  The Senate report noted that in October 2002, "the DIA cautioned that the INC was penetrated by hostile intelligence services and would use the relationship to promote its own agenda."

Senator John Rockefeller, the Committee's ranking Democrat, noted that "Today's reports show that the administration's repeated allegations of a past, present and future relationship between al Qaeda and Iraq were wrong and intended to exploit the deep sense of insecurity among Americans in the immediate aftermath of the September 11th attacks." But the head Republican on the Committee, Senator Pat Roberts, charged, "The additional views of the Committee's Democrats are little more than a rehashing of the same unfounded allegations they've used for over three years."

The "Postwar Findings" report had the following conclusions about Saddam's alleged links to al-Qaeda:

Conclusion 1: The CIA's assessment that Iraq and al-Qaeda were "two independent actors trying to exploit each other" was accurate only about al-Qaeda.  "Postwar findings indicate that Saddam Hussein was distrustful of al-Qa'ida and viewed Islamic extremists as a threat to his regime, refusing all requests from al-Qa'ida to provide material or operational support."

Conclusion 2: Postwar findings have indicated that there was only one meeting between representatives of Saddam Hussein and representatives of al-Qaeda.  These findings also identified two occasions "not reported prior to the war, in which Saddam Hussein rebuffed meeting requests from an al-Qa'ida operative.  The Intelligence Community has not found any other evidence of meetings between al-Qa'ida and Iraq."

Conclusion 3: "Prewar Intelligence Community assessments were inconsistent regarding the likelihood that Saddam Hussein provided chemical and biological weapons (CBW) training to al-Qa'ida.  Postwar findings support the Defense Intelligence Agency (DIA) February 2002 assessment that Ibn al-Shaykh al-Libi was likely intentionally misleading his debriefers when he said that Iraq provided two al-Qa'ida associates with chemical and biological weapons (CBW) training in 2000. ... No postwar information has been found that indicates CBW training occurred and the detainee who provided the key prewar reporting about this training recanted his claims after the war."

Conclusion 4: "Postwar findings support the April 2002 Defense Intelligence Agency (DIA) assessment that there was no credible reporting on al-Qa'ida training at Salman Pak or anywhere else in Iraq.  There have been no credible reports since the war that Iraq trained al-Qa'ida operatives at Salman Pak to conduct or support transnational terrorist operations."

Conclusion 5: Postwar findings support the assessment that Abu Musab al-Zarqawi and associates were present in Baghdad from May–November 2002.  "Prewar assessments expressed uncertainty about Iraq's complicity in their presence, but overestimated the Iraqi regime's capabilities to locate them.  Postwar information indicates that Saddam Hussein attempted, unsuccessfully, to locate and capture al-Zarqawi and that the regime did not have a relationship with, harbor, or turn a blind eye toward Zarqawi."

Conclusion 6: Prewar interactions between Saddam Hussein's government and al-Qaeda affiliate group Ansar al-Islam were attempts by Saddam to spy on the group rather than to support or work with them.  "Postwar information reveals that Baghdad viewed Ansar al-Islam as a threat to the regime and that the IIS attempted to collect intelligence on the group."

Conclusion 7: "Postwar information supports prewar Intelligence Community assessments that there was no credible information that Iraq was complicit in or had foreknowledge of the September 11 attacks or any other al-Qa'ida strike. ... .  Postwar findings support CIA's January 2003 assessment, which judged that 'the most reliable reporting casts doubt' on one of the leads, an alleged meeting between Muhammad Atta and an Iraqi intelligence officer in Prague, and confirm that no such meeting occurred.  Prewar intelligence reporting cast doubt on the other lead as well."

Conclusion 8: "No postwar information indicates that Iraq intended to use al-Qa'ida or any other terrorist group to strike the United States homeland before or during Operation Iraqi Freedom."

Conclusion 9: "additional reviews of documents recovered in Iraq are unlikely to provide information that would contradict the Committee's findings or conclusions.  The Committee believes that the results of detainee debriefs largely comport with documentary evidence, but the Committee cannot definitively judge the accuracy of statements made by individuals in custody and cannot, in every case, confirm that the detainee statements are truthful and accurate."

CIA conclusions

According to the SSCI report:

The CIA has not published a "fully researched, coordinated and approved position" on the postwar reporting on the former regime's links to al-Qa'ida, but has published such a paper on the postwar reporting of Abu Mus'ad al-Zarqawi and the former regime (see above).  The CIA told the Committee that regarding Iraq's links to terrorism, "the research the Counterterrorist Center has done on this issue has called into question some of the reports of contacts and training ... revealed other contacts of which we were unaware, and shed new light on some contacts that appeared in prewar reporting.  On balance, this research suggests that the prewar judgment remains valid.

DIA conclusions

According to the SSCI report:

The initial DocEx review focused on searching for WMD related documents, but the DIA also examined the documents for material related to Iraq's link to terrorism.  DIA officials explicitly stated that they did not believe that the initial review process missed any documents of major significance regarding Iraq's links to terrorism.  During an interview with Committee staff, the lead DIA analyst who follows the issue of possible connections between the Iraqi government and al-Qa'ida noted that the DIA "continues to maintain that there was no partnership between the two organizations. (Page 63) 

FBI

According to the report:

The FBI does not have formal efforts underway to review the prewar relationship between the former Iraqi regime and al-Qa'ida.  The FBI continues to analyze information and intelligence on Iraq, particularly in its conduct of interviews of high value targets and participation in document exploitation.  The FBI provided the Committee with particularly useful information from the debrief of Saddam Hussein and several high-ranking Iraqi intelligence officers. (page 134) 

Administration response
After the release of the report, Condoleezza Rice told Fox News Sunday that she did not remember seeing that particular report and asserted that "there were ties between Iraq and al-Qaeda." In an interview with Tim Russert on Meet the Press, Vice President Cheney stated, "We've never been able to confirm any connection between Iraq and 9/11."  However, Cheney asserted that there was nevertheless a connection between Iraq and al-Qaeda, citing Zarqawi's presence in Baghdad and DCI George Tenet's claim of "a relationship that went back at least a decade."  When pressed about the Senate Report, Cheney acknowledged, "I haven't seen the report. I haven't had a chance to read it yet."

2007 Pentagon Inspector General Report
In February 2007, the Pentagon's inspector general issued a report that concluded that Feith's Office of Special Plans, an office in the Pentagon run by Douglas Feith that was the source of most of the misleading intelligence on al-Qaeda and Iraq, had "developed, produced, and then disseminated alternative intelligence assessments on the Iraq and al Qaida relationship, which included some conclusions that were inconsistent with the consensus of the Intelligence Community, to senior decision-makers."  The report found that these actions were "inappropriate" though not "illegal."  Senator Carl Levin, Chair of the Senate Armed Services Committee, stated that "The bottom line is that intelligence relating to the Iraq-al-Qaeda relationship was manipulated by high-ranking officials in the Department of Defense to support the administration's decision to invade Iraq.  The inspector general's report is a devastating condemnation of inappropriate activities in the DOD policy office that helped take this nation to war."

Nevertheless, Feith stated that he "felt vindicated" by the report's conclusion that what he did was not "unlawful." He told The Washington Post that his office produced "a criticism of the consensus of the intelligence community," and he acknowledged that he "was not endorsing its substance."

 2008 Pentagon report 

In March 2008, a Pentagon-sponsored study was released, entitled Saddam and Terrorism: Emerging Insights from Captured Iraqi Documents, based on the review of more than 600,000 Iraqi documents captured after the 2003 US invasion.  The study "found no 'smoking gun' (i.e., direct connection) between Saddam's Iraq and al Qaeda." It did note that in the early 1990s "Saddam supported groups that either associated directly with al Qaeda (such as the Egyptian Islamic Jihad, led at one time by bin Laden's deputy, Ayman al-Zawahiri) or that generally shared al Qaeda's stated goals and objectives."

The abstract states that,

while these documents do not reveal direct coordination and assistance between the Saddam regime and the al Qaeda network, they do indicate that Saddam was willing to use, albeit cautiously, operatives affiliated with al Qaeda as long as Saddam could have these terrorist–operatives monitored closely ... This created both the appearance of and, in some ways, a 'de facto' link between the organizations. At times, these organizations would work together in pursuit of shared goals but still maintain their autonomy and independence because of innate caution and mutual distrust.

Further:

The report also stated that "captured documents reveal that the regime was willing to co-opt or support organizations it knew to be part of al Qaeda."  In July 2001, the Director for International Intelligence in the IIS had ordered an investigation into a terrorist group called The Army of Muhammad.  The investigation revealed the group "threatened Kuwaiti authorities and plans to attack American and Western interests" and was working with Osama bin Laden.  According to the report, "A later memorandum from the same collection to the Director
of the IIS reports that the Army of Muhammad is endeavoring to receive assistance [from Iraq] to implement its objectives, and that the local IIS station has been told to deal with them in accordance with priorities previously established. The IIS agent goes on to inform the Director that 'this organization is an offshoot of bin Laden, but that their objectives are similar but with different names that can be a way of camouflaging the organization.'"

The report goes on to point out that while both Saddam and al-Qaeda had a common enemy in the United States, "the similarities ended there: bin Laden wanted - and still wants - to restore the Islamic caliphate while Saddam, despite his later Islamic rhetoric, dreamed more narrowly of being the secular ruler of a united Arab nation. These competing visions made any significant long-term compromise between them highly unlikely. After all, to the fundamentalist leadership of al Qaeda, Saddam represented the worst kind of "apostate" regime - a secular police state well practiced in suppressing internal challenges."

As to Saddam's intentions toward the United States, the report states:

In the years between the two Gulf Wars, UN sanctions reduced Saddam's ability to shape regional and world events, steadily draining his economic, and military powers. The rise of Islamist fundamentalism in the region gave Saddam the opportunity to make terrorism, one of the few tools remaining in Saddam's "coercion" toolbox, not only cost effective but a formal instrument of state power. ... Evidence that was uncovered and analyzed attests to the existence of a terrorist capability and a willingness to use it until the day Saddam was forced to flee Baghdad by Coalition forces.

However, the evidence is less clear in terms of Saddam's declared will at the time of OPERATION IRAQI FREEDOM in 2003. Even with access to significant parts of the regime's most secretive archive, the answer to the question of Saddam's will in the final months in power remains elusive.

ABC News noted of the report that "The primary target, however, of Saddam's terror activities was not the United States, and not Israel.  "The predominant targets of Iraqi state terror operations were Iraqi citizens, both inside and outside of Iraq."  Saddam's primary aim was self-preservation and the elimination of potential internal threats to his power.

2008 Senate report 
In June 2008, the Senate Select Committee on Intelligence released the final part of its Phase II investigation into the intelligence assessments that led to the U.S. invasion and occupation of Iraq; this part of the investigation looked into statements of members of the Bush Administration and compared those statements to what the intelligence community was telling the Administration at the time.  The report, endorsed by eight Democrats and two Republicans on the Committee, concluded that "Statements and implications by the President and Secretary of State suggesting that Iraq and al-Qa'ida had a partnership, or that Iraq had provided al-Qa'ida with weapons training, were not substantiated by the intelligence."  The report concluded that "Statements ... regarding Iraq's contacts with al-Qa'ida were substantiated by intelligence information.  However, policymakers' statements did not accurately convey the intelligence assessments of the nature of these contacts, and left the impression that the contacts led to substantive Iraqi cooperation or support of al-Qa'ida."  The report also concluded that "Statements that Iraq provided safe haven for Abu Musab al-Zarqawi and other al-Qa'ida-related terrorist members were substantiated by the intelligence assessments.  Intelligence assessments noted Zarqawi's presence in Iraq and his ability to travel and operate within the country.  The intelligence community generally believed that Iraqi intelligence must have known about, and therefore at least tolerated, Zarqawi's presence in the country."

The New York Times called the report "especially critical of statements by the president and vice president linking Iraq to Al Qaeda and raising the possibility that Mr. Hussein might supply the terrorist group with unconventional weapons."  The Chair of the Committee, Senator John D. Rockefeller IV (D-WV), commented in an addendum to the report, "Representing to the American people that the two had an operational partnership and posed a single, indistinguishable threat was fundamentally misleading and led the nation to war on false premises."

In a minority addendum to the report signed by four Republican dissenters, the Republicans, according to the New York Times, "suggested that the investigation was a partisan smoke screen to obscure the real story: that the C.I.A. failed the Bush administration by delivering intelligence assessments to policy makers that have since been discredited." While the minority Senators do not take issue with the majority's conclusion that there was no evidence of Saddam-al-Qaeda conspiracy, they objected to the manner in which the report was assembled, calling the finished product "a waste of Committee time and resources."  According to the dissent, "the reports essentially validate what we have been saying all along:  the policymakers' statements were substantiated by the intelligence ... it was the intelligence that was faulty."  The dissent focused mainly on the Committee's reluctance to include statements made by previous administrations and members of Congress with regard to prewar intelligence.  The dissent also objected to the report's conclusion that President Bush and Vice President Cheney made statements that Saddam was "prepared to give weapons of mass destruction to terrorist groups for attacks against the United States."  According to the dissent, "neither President nor the Vice President said this."  The dissent also complained about the fact that the majority left out of its report "a handwritten note by a CIA officer at the bottom of one of the drafts [of the President's Cincinnati speech] said that the CIA terrorism analyst had 'read all the terrorism paragraphs and said it was all okay''.'"

References 

Al-Qaeda activities in Iraq
Causes and prelude of the Iraq War
9/11 conspiracy theories
Modern history of Iraq
Iraq–United States relations
George W. Bush administration controversies
Saddam Hussein and Al-Qaeda
Al-Qaeda
Iraq War